Leury García (born March 18, 1991) is a Dominican professional baseball utility player for the Chicago White Sox of Major League Baseball (MLB). He has previously played for the Texas Rangers. While primarily used as an infielder and center fielder, Garcia has experience at every position except catcher and first base.

Career
The Texas Rangers signed García as an international free agent in December 2007 after he participated in tryouts in the Dominican Republic. He played in the Rookie-level Arizona League for the Arizona League Rangers in 2008.

Garcia played for the Hickory Crawdads of the Class A South Atlantic League in 2009 and 2010, stealing 47 bases in 56 attempts during the 2010 season. He was promoted to the Myrtle Beach Pelicans of the Class A-Advanced Carolina League in 2011. He was voted the Carolina League Player of the Month for June 2011, in which he batted 38-for-111 (.342 batting average), leading the league with 22 runs, 38 hits, 51 total bases, and 10 stolen bases. He was assigned to play for the Frisco RoughRiders of the Class AA Texas League for the 2012 season. After batting .292 with 12 doubles, 11 triples, two home runs, 30 runs batted in, and 31 stolen bases in 100 games for Frisco, the Rangers added García to their 40-man roster after the 2012 season to protect him from being selected by another team in the Rule 5 draft.

Texas Rangers
García played for the Dominican Republic national baseball team in the 2013 World Baseball Classic. He spent most games not playing, but observing veteran shortstops Miguel Tejada and Jose Reyes. He made the Rangers' Opening Day roster for the 2013 season as a utility infielder. He made his major league debut on April 6 as a pinch hitter for Lance Berkman, striking out in his first at-bat. He was optioned to the Triple-A Round Rock Express on June 14, 2013, when Ian Kinsler returned from the disabled list.

Chicago White Sox
On August 11, 2013, the Rangers traded García to the Chicago White Sox as the player to be named later in the trade that sent Alex Ríos to Texas. He was then optioned to the Triple-A Charlotte Knights. The White Sox promoted García on August 22. In 20 games with Chicago in 2013, he hit .204 with 1 RBI and 6 SB.

With both Gordon Beckham and Jeff Keppinger injured to begin the season, García made the Opening Day roster in 2014. On April 16, García made his first career appearance on the mound, working the 14th inning in a game against Boston. He gave up 2 runs on 2 walks and a double, picking up the loss. On June 4, García hit his first major-league home run, a go-ahead solo shot off of Dodgers starter Josh Beckett. On July 2, 2014, Garcia got his first walk-off hit with a pinch hit single off of Los Angeles Angels pitcher Mike Morin to win the game for the White Sox 3–2.

In 2019 he batted .279/.310/.378, and led the American League in ground ball percentage (54.9%), while having the lowest fly ball percentage in the AL (23.6%). He also led the American League with 11 sacrifice hits.

García appeared in 16 games in 2020 before he injured his left thumb after he attempted to beat a throw to first base with a headfirst slide in a game against the Detroit Tigers that required surgery ending his 2020 regular season. He was able to return in time for the postseason. He made his postseason debut in game 1 of the Wild Card Series against the Oakland Athletics.

On September 12, 2021, García hit a walk-off home run off of Boston Red Sox pitcher Garrett Whitlock to win the game for the White Sox 2–1. After collecting his first postseason hit on October 8, García hit his first postseason home run off of Yimi García two days later to take a 6–5 lead over the Houston Astros in Game 3 of the American League Division Series. The White Sox won the game 12–6 to force a Game 4, which they lost. In 126 games in 2021, García hit .267/.335/.736 with five home runs and 54 RBIs while batting .200 in the postseason.

On December 1, 2021, García re-signed with the White Sox on a three-year, $16.5 million contract.

Personal
García has two sisters who live in Santiago.

References

External links

1991 births
Living people
Arizona League Rangers players
Charlotte Knights players
Chicago White Sox players
Dominican Republic expatriate baseball players in the United States
Frisco RoughRiders players
Gigantes del Cibao players
Hickory Crawdads players

Major League Baseball outfielders
Major League Baseball players from the Dominican Republic
Major League Baseball second basemen
Major League Baseball shortstops
Major League Baseball third basemen
Myrtle Beach Pelicans players
People from Santiago de los Caballeros
Round Rock Express players
Surprise Saguaros players
Texas Rangers players
World Baseball Classic players of the Dominican Republic
2013 World Baseball Classic players